was a Japanese manga artist.

He started drawing the Taberemasen ("not fit for consumption") yonkoma cartoon in 1995 in the Kodansha-published Young Magazine while still in high school, and continued the series until 2013. Besides publishing in Young Magazine, he also published social satire cartoons in the weekly magazine Friday.

He died on October 22, 2013, from liver failure.

References

訃報:風間やんわりさん３６歳＝漫画家　「食べれません」Obituary 

1977 births
2013 deaths
Manga artists from Tokyo